The Battle of Ouithlacoochie, otherwise known as the Battle of Withlacoochee was a battle, in the Second Seminole War fought on December 31, 1835, along the Withlacoochee River in modern Citrus County, Florida.

Prelude 

After the Dade Massacre, the Florida militia reached the Withlacoochee River, however an unexpected difficulty was found. The stream was deep and rapid, there was no bridge, and the only means of crossing was in a leaky canoe that would hold only four or five men. An effort was made to swim the horses over, but only two could be gotten across in that way. The crossing began at daylight, the regular soldiers going first, and at noon only 260 had crossed. They tried to make rafts, but there was no suitable wood. The men who could do so swam the river, and ammunition was carried over on a raft of tree logs.

Battle 

The regulars and a few of the volunteers had crossed, when the Indians began a severe and unexpected fire.  General Call, having made a footbridge of logs, was trying to get his men across as fast as possible when the attack began. He now left them with orders to cross as rapidly as they could, and crossed in the canoe himself while the fight was at the worst. As many of the volunteers as could do so crossed during the fight, thus preventing the Indians from getting between the regular troops and the river, and so cutting them off.

Battles of the Seminole Wars
December 1835 events
1835 in Florida Territory
Muscogee
Citrus County, Florida
Native American history of Florida